Patrick Barnabas Burke Mayhew, Baron Mayhew of Twysden,  (11 September 1929 – 25 June 2016) was a British barrister and politician.

Early life
atrick’s father, George Mayhew, was a decorated army officer turned oil executive; his mother, Sheila Roche, was a relative of James Roche, 3rd Baron Fermoy, an Irish National Federation MP for Kerry East. Through his father, Mayhew was descended from the Victorian social commentator Henry Mayhew.  He was educated at Tonbridge School, an all boys public school in Tonbridge, Kent. 

He then served as an officer in the 4th/7th Royal Dragoon Guards, studied law at Balliol College, Oxford, and was president of the Oxford University Conservative Association and of the Oxford Union. He was called to the Bar by the Middle Temple in 1955.

Political career
Mayhew contested Dulwich in 1970, but the incumbent Labour member, Sam Silkin, beat him by 895 votes. He was Member of Parliament (MP) for the Tunbridge Wells constituency from its creation at the February 1974 general election, standing down at the 1997 election.

He was Under Secretary of Employment from 1979 to 1981, then Minister of State at the Home Office from 1981 to 1983. After this, he served as Solicitor General for England and Wales from 1983 to 1987, and then Attorney General for England and Wales and simultaneously Attorney General for Northern Ireland from 1987 to 1992.

He was Secretary of State for Northern Ireland from 1992 to 1997, the longest anyone has served in this office.

He was one of only five Ministers (Tony Newton, Kenneth Clarke, Malcolm Rifkind and Lynda Chalker are the others) to serve throughout the whole 18 years of the Governments of Margaret Thatcher and John Major. This represents the longest uninterrupted Ministerial service in Britain since Lord Palmerston in the early 19th century.

Honours and awards
Mayhew was knighted in 1983. On 12 June 1997, he was given a life peerage as Baron Mayhew of Twysden, of Kilndown in the County of Kent. He retired from the House of Lords on 1 June 2015.

Personal life
In 1963, Mayhew married The Rev. Jean Gurney, and they had four sons. Mayhew's son, The Hon Henry Mayhew, appeared in the fourth episode of the series The Secret History Of Our Streets, discussing life in the Portland Road, Notting Hill, London. Another son, Tristram, co-founded the outdoor adventure company Go Ape.

His son, Jerome Mayhew, is the Conservative MP for the constituency of Broadland in Norfolk since December 2019.

Mayhew suffered from cancer and Parkinson's disease in his later years. He died on 25 June 2016, aged 86, in his home in Kent.

References

External links
 
 
 
 
 
 
 

|-

|-

|-

|-

1929 births
2016 deaths
Alumni of Balliol College, Oxford
Attorneys General for England and Wales
Attorneys General for Northern Ireland
British barristers
British King's Counsel
British Secretaries of State
Conservative Party (UK) MPs for English constituencies
Conservative Party (UK) life peers
Deputy Lieutenants of Kent
Knights Bachelor
Members of the Middle Temple
Members of the Privy Council of the United Kingdom
People educated at Tonbridge School
People of The Troubles (Northern Ireland)
Politics of the Borough of Tunbridge Wells
20th-century King's Counsel
Secretaries of State for Northern Ireland
Solicitors General for England and Wales
UK MPs 1974
UK MPs 1974–1979
UK MPs 1979–1983
UK MPs 1983–1987
UK MPs 1987–1992
UK MPs 1992–1997
Presidents of the Oxford Union
Presidents of the Oxford University Conservative Association
Mayhew family
Life peers created by Elizabeth II